Roofing can mean:
Roofing material, used in the construction of a roof
Rooftopping, roof hacking for high risk photos
The profession of a roofer

See also
 Roof, for general description of roofs and roofing